The Ohio State Auditor (formally known as the Auditor of State) is responsible for auditing all the public offices of the state of Ohio. The auditor is elected to a four-year term. The current Auditor is Keith Faber.

References

External links
Auditor of State website

Ohio